Carsten Eggers (18 May 1957 – 29 September 2021) was a German sculptor and painter.
There are about 20 realistic bronze sculptures of his in northern Germany and the Netherlands.
His best-known works are a bronze bust of Rudi Carrell and a larger-than-life monument of boxing legend Max Schmeling.

Life 
The son of the impressionist painter Richard Eggers, Carsten Eggers was born in Stade, in Lower Saxony, and grew up in the town of Jork in the  region, an area of reclaimed marshland on the Elbe downstream from Hamburg.
Deciding against an academic career he studied all aspects of painting with his father, an accomplished artist who in 1975 was awarded the Knight's Cross of the Order of Merit of the Federal Republic of Germany for his life's work.
At the age of only 17, Carsten Eggers designed the coat of arms of the municipality of Jork.
In 1979 he had his first exhibition of paintings, in his home town of Jork, together with his father.

After 1980 he turned to sculpture, studying under Professor Franz Rotter in Cuxhaven, and from 1983 he studied Sculpture under Karl Heinz Türk at the Freie Kunstakademie (Free Art Academy) in Nürtingen. Defying the usual conventions, Eggers kept himself to himself, shunned the arts "establishment", and was not a member of any artists' associations. Since 1991 Carsten Eggers has lived and worked at a former farm in Nottensdorf in the rural district of Stade.

Eggers died aged 64 on 29 September 2021 in hospital in Hamburg.

Works 

Eggers' early sculptures were stylized, as in the 1986 larger-than-life bronze  (The Watchers), which was commissioned by the town of Stade.
He later turned to realism, which characterizes all of his other bronzes in public places.
Eggers first makes clay models of his subjects, which include busts of famous people.
They are cast first in plaster of Paris and then in bronze.
The clients who commission his works are towns and other municipalities, and private-sector patrons of the arts.
Eggers' works always have humans as their focus.
Many of his sculptures show people in everyday situations; these are all based on live models.

Characteristics of the bronze sculptures 
Typical characteristics of Eggers sculptures are the casual poses and a very slight exaggeration.
As the scholar and art critic Klaus Frerichs said, "Sein Realismus scheint darin zu bestehen, dass man zu erkennen glaubt, was die Figuren darstellen. Aber sie sind weder Abbilder noch Karikaturen. Eggers zeichnet Begriffe zu Bildern. Mimik, Gestik, Haltung – nichts ist Zufall." [His realism seems to be such that you think you know what the figures represent. But they are neither copies nor caricatures. Eggers portrays concepts as images. Facial expressions, gestures, posture –nothing is random.]

A slightly exaggerated belly, a few more wrinkles on the face, the nose a bit longer: all this together has an amazing effect. In the end the bronze image is a better likeness than the original.
Art critics call Eggers' works "whole-body portraits".
Art historian  (who died in 2005) stated:
"Carsten Eggers Plastiken sind das Ergebnis künstlerischer Gestaltung, die jeder herkömmlichen Gegenständlichkeit trotzen und durch Lebendigkeit aufmerksam machen. Seine Stärke ist es, die menschlichen Stärken und Schwächen einzufangen. Ein Künstler, der völlig losgelöst von jeweiligen Trends seinen Weg geht."
[Carsten Eggers' sculptures are the result of an artistic composition that means they defy conventional realism and attract attention by their vibrancy. His forte is capturing human strength and weakness. An artist who goes his own way without regard to the current trends.]
The artist sees his work as memorials of serenity running counter to the short-termism and hectic pace of today's life and thus representing an opposing pole to them.

Paintings 

Eggers' paintings are very varied thematically. The early works are strongly influenced by expressionism. After an impressionist phase his style became more and more characterized by realism. The realism of his paintings became more pronounced during his study trips to America, China, Brazil, France, Madeira, Portugal, Spain and Tunisia, which lasted several months,

Together with his change in style he switches to pastel, and adds portraits, nudes, and elaborate compositions to his repertoire
This leads to oversized pastel paintings, some comprising five elements and up to four metres wide, hanging in public places.

Works in public places 

 Die Wachenden [The Watchers] (Stade, town centre) 1986, bronze, larger-than-life
 Flethenkieker [Man by the Canal], (Buxtehude, town centre) 1989, bronze, life-size
 De ole Schipper [The Old Mariner] (Estebrügge, town centre) 1989, bronze, life-size
 Drei Generationen [Three Generations] (Rotenburg, town centre) 1995, bronze, life-size
 Mönch Heinrich [Henry the Monk] (Steinkirchen, Church of St. Martini-et-Nicolai) 1992, bronze, larger-than-life
 Priester Hendrik [Henry the Priest] (Netherlands, Rijnsaterwoude) 2001, bronze, larger-than-life
 Deichgraf [The Dijkgraaf] (Krautsand) 2000, bronze larger-than-life
 Liborius (Bremervörde, town centre) 1993, bronze, life-size
 Lesender Mönch [Monk, reading] (Stade, town centre) 1987, bronze, life-size
 Erkennender Petrus [St. Peter Seeing the Truth] (Hamburg, city centre) 1999, bronze, life-size
 Bust of Friedrich Huth (Harsefeld, town centre) 1998, bronze, larger-than-life
 Feldarbeiterin [Woman Working in the Fields] (Deinste, town centre) 1993, bronze, larger-than-life
 Johannis [St. John] (Neuenkirchen, church) 1993, bronze, life-size
 Bust of Hermann Rauhe (Hochschule für Musik und Theater Hamburg) 1993, bronze life-size
 Skuld (Horneburg, town centre) 2005, bronze, life-size
 Bust of RudiCarrell (Netherlands, Alkmaar, Rudi Carrellplaats) 2007, bronze, larger-than-life
 Erz-Abt zu Harsefeld [The Archabbot of Harsefeld] (Harsefeld) 2009, bronze, life-size
 Max-Schmeling-Denkmal [Max Schmeling monument] (Hollenstedt) 2010, bronze bust, larger-than-life

Exhibitions 
 International Hanseatic Days, Town Hall Braunschweig, 1986
 Faces and views – Altes Land Museum, Jork, 1991
 Death-defying – Museum of Sepulchral Culture, Kassel, September 2006 – February 2007

References

External links 

 Personal Web site

1957 births
2021 deaths
20th-century German sculptors
20th-century German male artists
German male sculptors
20th-century German painters
German male painters
People from Stade